RAGE (receptor for advanced glycation endproducts), also called AGER, is a 35 kilodalton transmembrane receptor of the immunoglobulin super family which was first characterized in 1992 by Neeper et al. Its name comes from its ability to bind advanced glycation endproducts (AGE), which include chiefly glycoproteins, the glycans of which have been modified non-enzymatically through the Maillard reaction. In view of its inflammatory function in innate immunity and its ability to detect a class of ligands through a common structural motif, RAGE is often referred to as a pattern recognition receptor.   RAGE also has at least one other agonistic ligand: high mobility group protein B1 (HMGB1). HMGB1 is an intracellular DNA-binding protein important in chromatin remodeling which can be released by necrotic cells passively, and by active secretion from macrophages, natural killer cells, and dendritic cells.

The interaction between RAGE and its ligands is thought to result in pro-inflammatory gene activation. Due to an enhanced level of RAGE ligands in diabetes or other chronic disorders, this receptor is hypothesised to have a causative effect in a range of inflammatory diseases such as diabetic complications, Alzheimer's disease and even some tumors.

Isoforms of the RAGE protein, which lack the transmembrane and the signaling domain (commonly referred to as soluble RAGE or sRAGE) are hypothesized to counteract the detrimental action of the full-length receptor and are hoped to provide a means to develop a cure against RAGE-associated diseases.

Gene and polymorphisms 
The RAGE gene lies within the major histocompatibility complex (MHC class III region) on chromosome 6 and comprises 11 exons interlaced by 10 introns. Total length of the gene is about 1400 base pairs (bp) including the promoter region, which partly overlaps with the PBX2 gene. About 30 polymorphisms are known most of which are single-nucleotide polymorphisms.

RNA and alternative splicing 
The primary transcript of the human RAGE gene (pre-mRNA) is thought to be alternatively spliced. So far about 6 isoforms including the full length transmembrane receptor have been found in different tissues such as lung, kidney, brain etc. Five of these 6 isoforms lack the transmembrane domain and are thus believed to be secreted from cells. Generally these isoforms are referred to as sRAGE (soluble RAGE) or esRAGE (endogenous secretory RAGE).  One of the isoforms lacks the V-domain and is thus believed not to be able to bind RAGE ligands.

Structure 
RAGE exists in the body in two forms: a membrane-bound form known as mRAGE, and a soluble form, known as sRAGE. mRAGE has three domains, and sRAGE has only the extracellular domain. sRAGE is either the product of alternative splicing or the product of proteolytic cleavage of mRAGE.

The full receptor consists of the following domains: The cytosolic domain, which is responsible for signal transduction, the transmembrane domain which anchors the receptor in the cell membrane, the variable domain which binds the RAGE ligands, and two constant domains.

Ligands 
RAGE is able to bind several ligands and therefore is referred to as a pattern-recognition receptor. Ligands which have so far been found to bind RAGE are:

AGE
HMGB1 (Amphoterin)
S100A12 (EN-RAGE)
S100B
S100A7 (psoriasin) but not highly homologous S100A15 (koebnerisin)
S100P
S100A8/A9 complex referred to as calprotectin
Amyloid-β-protein
Mac-1
Phosphatidylserine.
S100A4

RAGE and disease 

RAGE has been linked to several chronic diseases, which are thought to result from vascular damage. The pathogenesis is hypothesized to include ligand binding, upon which RAGE signals activation of nuclear factor kappa B (NF-κB). NF-κB controls several genes involved in inflammation. RAGE itself is upregulated by NF-κB.  Given a condition in which there is a large amount of RAGE ligands (e.g. AGE in diabetes or amyloid-β-protein in Alzheimer's disease) this establishes a positive feed-back cycle, which leads to chronic inflammation.  This chronic condition is then believed to alter the micro- and macrovasculature, resulting in organ damage or even organ failure. However, whilst RAGE is up-regulated in inflammatory conditions, it is down-regulated in lung cancer and pulmonary fibrosis. Diseases that have been linked to RAGE are: 
 
Alzheimer's disease
Arthritis
Atherosclerosis
Congestive heart failure
Congenital diaphragmatic hernia
Diabetes
Myocardial infarction
Peripheral vascular disease
Psoriasis
Rheumatoid arthritis
Takayasu's arteritis

RAGE is expressed at the highest levels in the lung compared to other tissues, in particular in alveolar type I cells, and is lost in idiopathic pulmonary fibrosis (IPF) indicating that expression and regulation of RAGE in the pulmonary system differs from that in the vascular system. Blockade/knockdown of RAGE resulted in impaired cell adhesion, and increased cell proliferation and migration

Inhibitors 
A number of small molecule RAGE inhibitors or antagonists have been reported.

Azeliragon vTv Therapeutics (formerly TransTech Pharma) sponsored a Phase 3 clinical trial of their RAGE inhibitor Azeliragon (TTP488) for mild Alzheimer's disease. These trials were halted in 2018.

AGE receptors 

Besides RAGE there are other receptors which are believed to bind advanced glycation endproducts. However, these receptors could play a role in the removal of AGE rather than in signal transduction as is the case for RAGE. Other AGE receptors are:

SR-A (Macrophage scavenger receptor Type I and II)
OST-48 (Oligosaccharyl transferase-4) (AGE-R1)
80 K-H phosphoprotein (Proteinkinase C substrate) (AGE-R2) 
Galectin-3 (AGE-R3)
LOX-1 (Lectin-like oxidized low density lipoprotein receptor-1)
CD36

References

Further reading

External links 
 
 AGER on the Atlas of Genetics and Oncology
 
 

Receptors